The 2016 Sibiu Open was a professional tennis tournament played on clay courts. It was the fifth edition of the tournament which was part of the 2016 ATP Challenger Tour. It took place in Sibiu, Romania between 19 and 25 September 2016.

Singles main-draw entrants

Seeds

 1 Rankings are as of September 12, 2016.

Other entrants
The following players received wildcards into the singles main draw:
  Victor Vlad Cornea
  Victor-Mugurel Anagnastopol
  Michał Dembek
  Bogdan Borza

The following player received entry using a protected ranking:
  Tim Pütz

The following player received entry as an alternate:
  Danilo Petrović

The following players received entry from the qualifying draw:
  Christopher O'Connell
  Lenny Hampel
  Jonas Lütjen
  Andreas Mies

Champions

Singles

 Robin Haase def.   Lorenzo Giustino, 7–6(7–2), 6–2.

Doubles

 Robin Haase /  Tim Pütz def.  Jonathan Eysseric /  Tristan Lamasine, 6–4, 6–2.

External links
Official Website

Sibiu Open
Sibiu Open
2016 in Romanian tennis